Eddy Cobiness, (July 17, 1933 – January 1, 1996) was a Canadian artist.  He was an Ojibwe-Native Canadian and his art work is characterized by scenes from the life outdoors and nature.  He began with realistic scenes and then evolved into more abstract work.  He belonged to the "Woodland School of Art" and was a prominent member of the "Professional Native Indian Artists Incorporation", better known as the "Indian Group of Seven".  He was a graphic designer who began drawing pictures of birds in sand, snow or on cardboard, in his childhood. In the 1950s, during his military service years, he discovered working in watercolour.  He studied colour and composition.  In the 1960s his ink and watercolour drawings were commercially successful, and he began his art career.  For Cobiness, the life outdoors and nature always was subject of his works.  He began with realistic scenes and then evolve into more abstract work, influenced by his art colleague at the time, painter Benjamin Chee Chee. He further developed his work unimpeded and worked with several styles, using many media. It would bring him international recognition.  It is known that Queen Elizabeth II has work of Cobiness in her collection. Cobiness died in Winnipeg, Manitoba, on January 1, 1996, of complications from diabetes.

Life
Cobiness grew up on Buffalo Point First Nation's Indian reserve in southeast Manitoba.  Cobiness belongs to the "Indian Group of Seven" along with Jackson Beardy, Alex Janvier, Norval Morrisseau, Daphne Odjig, Carl Ray and Joseph Sanchez.  Through a united effort the group created a niche for First Nations Artists in the Canadian Art landscape.

Family
Cobiness had a wife named Helen and 9 children.

References

External links
 Seventh Generation Gallery "Native Contemporary Canadian Art Gallery" in the Netherlands, including art of Eddy Cobiness.
 Eddy Cobiness art at Google Images
 Eddy Cobiness member of the Indian Group of Seven Website "Native Art In Canada".

Ojibwe people
First Nations painters
Artists from Manitoba
1933 births
1996 deaths
20th-century American painters
American male painters
Woodlands style
20th-century Canadian painters
Canadian male painters
20th-century American male artists
20th-century Canadian male artists